This is a list of television serial dramas broadcast by VV Drama in 2013. Variety shows and encore timeslots will not be shown on this list.

Hong Kong

8.00pm TVB series
These dramas air in Singapore from 8:00pm to 9:00pm, Monday to Friday on VV Drama.

9.00pm TVB series
These dramas air in Singapore from 9:00pm to 10:00pm, Monday to Friday on VV Drama.

10.00pm TVB sitcoms
These dramas air in Singapore from 10:00pm to 10:30pm, Monday to Friday on VV Drama.

7.45pm TVB series
These dramas air in Singapore from 7:45pm to 9:30pm, weekends on VV Drama, 2 episodes back-to-back.

China

2.00pm series
These dramas air in Singapore from 7:15am to 8:15am, and repeats from 2:00pm to 3:00pm and 11:45pm to 12:45am, weekends on VV Drama.

Saturday 6.00pm series
These dramas air in Singapore from 6:00pm to 7:45pm, Saturdays on VV Drama, two episodes back-to-back.

Taiwan

Sunday 6.00pm series
These dramas air in Singapore from 6:00pm to 7:45pm, Saturdays on VV Drama, two episodes back-to-back.

Japan
These dramas air in Singapore from 10:30pm to 12:45am, Fridays on VV Drama, two episodes back-to-back.

Korea

Saturday 9.30pm series
These dramas air in Singapore from 9:30pm to 11:45pm, Saturdays on VV Drama, two episodes back-to-back.

Sunday 9.30pm series
These dramas air in Singapore from 9:30pm to 11:45pm, Sundays on VV Drama, two episodes back-to-back.

Other countries

5.45pm series
These dramas air in Singapore from 5:45pm to 7:00pm, Monday to Friday on VV Drama.

7.00pm series
These dramas air in Singapore from 7:00pm to 8:00pm, Monday to Friday on VV Drama.

See also
VV Drama

External links
    Starhub CableTV programme guide

VV Dramas